Tarkki is a Finnish surname. Notable people with the surname include:

 Iiro Tarkki (born 1985), Finnish ice hockey goaltender
 Saija Tarkki (born 1982), Finnish ice hockey player
 Tuomas Tarkki (born 1980), Finnish ice hockey goaltender

Finnish-language surnames